Harpa kajiyamai is a species of sea snail, a marine gastropod mollusk in the family Harpidae, the harp snails.

Description

Distribution
According to Hardy, this species ranges from Somalia in the western Indian Ocean to Okinawa in the western Pacific Ocean. Specimens of this species have been collected in the Philippines.

References

External links

Harpidae
Gastropods described in 1970